Adelbert is a given name of German origin, which means "noble bright" or "noble shining", derived from the words adal (meaning noble) and berht (shining or bright). Alternative spellings include Adalbart and Adalberto. Related names include Albert, Delbert, and Elbert. The name Adelbert may refer to:

Adelbert Althouse (1869–1954), American politician
Adelbert Ames (1835–1933), American politician
Adelbert Ames Jr. (1880–1955), American scientist
Adelbert Anson (1840–1909), English-born Canadian clergyman
Adelbert S. Atherton (1850–1920), American politician
Adelbert Bleekman (1846–1908), American politician
Adelbert Brownlow-Cust, 3rd Earl Brownlow (1844–1921), British soldier, courtier and Conservative politician
Adelbert Bryan (fl. 1980s–2000s), U.S. Virgin Islands politician
Adelbert Rinaldo Buffington (1837–1922), United States Army Brigadier General
Adelbert Cronkhite (1861–1937), career United States Army officer
Adelbert Delbrück (1822–1890), German banker 
Adelbert Heinrich Graf von Baudissin (1820–1871), German writer
Adelbert Edward Hanna (1863–1918), Canadian politician
Adelbert Everson (1841–1913), American Civil War soldier
Adelbert Ford (1890–1976), American psychologist
Adelbert Jenkins (fl. 1960s–2000s), African American clinical psychologistknown for his humanistic approach to Black psychology
Adelbert J. McCormick (1845–1903), American merchant and politician
Adelbert Mühlschlegel (1897–1980), prominent German Baháʼí
Adelbert Niemeyer (1867–1932), German painter
Adelbert Nongrum (fl. 2010s–2020s), Indian politician
Adelbert H. Roberts (1866–1937), first African-American to serve in the Illinois Senate
Adelbert Schulz (1903–1944), German general
Adelbert St. John (1931–2009), Canadian-Austrian professional ice hockey player
Adelbert Delos Thorp (1844–1919), American farmer, fisherman, and Wisconsin pioneer
Adelbert L. Utt (1856–1936), American politician
Adelbert Van de Walle (1922–2006), Belgian architect and art historian 
Adelbert von Chamisso (1781–1838), German writer
Adelbert von Keller (1812–1883), German scholar
Adelbert Waldron (1933–1995), United States Army sniper
Adelbert Theodor Wangemann (1855–1906), German-born American laboratory assistant to Thomas Edison

See also
Adalbert, a given name
Adalberto, a given name
Adelbert, Missouri
Aldebert (disambiguation)

Masculine given names
German masculine given names